The Guangzhou–Maoming railway or Guangmao railway, is a railroad in Guangdong Province of China between Guangzhou, the provincial capital, and Maoming. Major cities and towns along route include Guangzhou, Sanshui, Zhaoqing, Xinxing County, Yangchun, and Maoming.

History
The Guangmao railway was officially named in February 2004 when the Guangzhou railway (Group) Company established the Guangsan railway Joint-Stock Company Limited to operate both the Guangsan and Sanmao lines.

Guangzhou–Sanshui railway

The Guangzhou–Sanshui railway was built from 1902 to 1904 by an American company from 1902 to 1904 as an extension of the Guangdong–Hankou railway, west from Guangzhou through Foshan to Sanshui.

Sanshui–Maoming railway
The Sanshui–Maoming railway, which forms the main railway of western Guangdong, was built in sections from 1958 to 1991.  The Sanshui-Yunfu section was completed in 1983.  The entire line entered operations on May 3, 1991.

Yangchun–Yangdong branch line
In December 2001, the Yangchun–Yangjianggang railway, a branch line off of the Sanmao line from Yangchun to the port of Dayangjiang, was completed.

Rail connections
 Guangzhou: Beijing–Guangzhou railway, Guangzhou–Shenzhen railway, Guangzhou–Meizhou–Shantou railway
 Yangchun: Yangchun–Yangjianggang railway
 Maoming: Luoyang–Zhanjiang railway, Hechun–Maoming railway

See also

 List of railways in China

References

Railway lines in China
Rail transport in Guangdong
Railway lines opened in 1904